Hopton-on-Sea was a railway station serving the village of Hopton-on-Sea in Norfolk on the Norfolk and Suffolk Joint Railway line between Great Yarmouth and Lowestoft. It opened in 1903 and closed in 1970.

The station opened as Hopton on 13 July 1903 and was renamed to Hopton-on-Sea on 18 July 1932.

From 1935 to 1939 and possibly for some of 1934, Hopton had a static LNER Camping coach in a siding. It was used as accommodation for holiday makers.  A coach was also positioned here by Eastern Region of British Railways from 1952 to 1954, then there were two coaches until the end of the 1960 season. These were replaced  in 1961 by two Pullman camping coaches until all camping coaches in the region were withdrawn at the end of the 1965 season.

In the 1960s the station was destaffed and the line was reduced from double track to single track. The station closed on 4 May 1970 with the rest of the line.

After closure the station was demolished, the embankments and infrastructure removed and the site redeveloped with housing leaving no trace of the railways existence except the road which served the station is still called Station Road. The former Station Masters House is now a private residence called "Station House".

References

External links
 Hopton station on 1946 O.S. map

Disused railway stations in Norfolk
Former Norfolk and Suffolk Joint Railway stations
Railway stations in Great Britain opened in 1903
Railway stations in Great Britain closed in 1970
Beeching closures in England